Kevin Schöneberg (born 24 August 1985) is a German former professional footballer who played as a defender.

Career
Born in Cologne, Schöneberg made his professional debut for hometown club 1. FC Köln in the 2006–07 season in the 2. Bundesliga. On 27 January 2009, he left Cologne to join Hansa Rostock. However, Schöneberg left Hansa Rostock for Arminia Bielefeld on 4 October 2010. After half a year in Bielefeld, he transferred to VfL Osnabrück on the last day of the winter transfer window in January 2011. In April 2011 he, along with Björn Lindemann, was suspended by VfL Osnabrück for appearing to training under the influence of alcohol.

He was released on 30 June 2011 and subsequently signed for Viktoria Köln.

Personal life
In July 2017, Schöneberg was playing for amateur side Westfalia Kinderhaus.

References

External links
 
 

1985 births
Living people
Association football defenders
German footballers
1. FC Köln players
1. FC Köln II players
FC Hansa Rostock players
Arminia Bielefeld players
VfL Osnabrück players
FC Viktoria Köln players
SC Preußen Münster players
2. Bundesliga players
3. Liga players
Regionalliga players
Footballers from Cologne